Anne Arnouts (born 17 October 1989) is a former Belgian racing cyclist. She finished in third place in the Belgian National Road Race Championships in 2008.

References

External links

1989 births
Living people
Belgian female cyclists
Cyclists from Antwerp
People from Ekeren
Universiade medalists in cycling
Universiade bronze medalists for Belgium
Medalists at the 2011 Summer Universiade
21st-century Belgian women